Mount Thom is a community in the Canadian province of Nova Scotia, located in  Pictou County. It is at an elevation of 200m and is situated on Nova Scotia Trunk 4.

Mount Thom is also the name of a hill to the east of the community and on the other side of the highway. It has an elevation of 250m.

References

Communities in Pictou County
General Service Areas in Nova Scotia